Sunny Edet Ohia is a professor of Pharmacology at Texas Southern University. He is a fellow of the Nigerian Academy of Science, elected into the Academy’s Fellowship at its Annual General Meeting held in January 2015.

References

Year of birth missing (living people)
Living people
Fellows of the Nigerian Academy of Science
Texas Southern University faculty